Voliva is a surname. Notable people with the surname include:

Richard Voliva (1912–1999), American sport wrestler and coach
Wilbur Glenn Voliva (1870–1942), American evangelist and Flat Earth proponent

See also
Voliba